is a trans-Neptunian object approximately  in diameter.  it is approximately  from the Sun.

At a visual apparent magnitude of 26.2, it is one of the faintest trans-Neptunian objects observed and only the largest telescopes in the world can observe it. Being so far from the Sun,  moves very slowly among the background stars and has only been observed eight times over 355 days. It requires an observation arc of several years to refine the uncertainties in the approximately 700-year orbital period and determine whether it is currently near or at aphelion (farthest distance from the Sun). As of 2021 the nominal JPL Horizons solution has it coming to aphelion around the year 2288, whereas Project Pluto (which only fit 5 of the 8 observations) shows it reached aphelion around 2015.

Discovery 

 was first observed by Scott Sheppard, Chad Trujillo, and David Tholen on 13 October 2015 using the Subaru Telescope, a large reflecting telescope at the Mauna Kea Observatories on the summit of Mauna Kea with a primary mirror  in diameter. In 2015 it was only observed for 26 days, which is a very short observation arc for a trans-Neptunian object as objects far from the Sun move very slowly across the sky. It is calculated that it will remain in the constellation of Aries from 1994 until 2077. It was announced on 13 March 2018 alongside several other trans-Neptunian objects with a current heliocentric distance greater than 50 AU.

Orbit 

At a visual apparent magnitude of 26.2, it is about 75 million times fainter than what can be seen with the naked eye, and it is one of the dimmest trans-Neptunian objects ever observed, only being able to be seen by the largest modern telescopes. The JPL Small-Body Database estimates that it came to perihelion (closest approach to the Sun) around the year . JPL estimates aphelion (farthest distance from the Sun) to be in 2288 at 142 AU whereas Project Pluto (which only fit 5 of the 8 observations) estimates aphelion was in 2015 at 86 AU. As the JPL solution fits all 8 observations, it is a better orbit determination. When dealing with statistics of small numbers, automation can reject some data unnecessarily.

Distance from the Sun 

The precise distance of  still remains unknown due to its poorly understood orbit and the fact it has not been observed since 2016. At magnitude 26, it is only observable with a small number of telescopes that are capable of following it up and refining its orbit. It is expected to come to opposition in the constellation of Aries around 3 November 2021 when it should have a solar elongation of roughly 175°.

There are 804 known objects that have aphelia more than 89 AU from the Sun as of March 2018. This distance is about double the outer limit of the torus-shaped Kuiper belt that lies outside Neptune's orbit. Far beyond this region is the vast spherical Oort cloud enshrouding the Solar System, whose presence was deduced from the orbits of long-period comets.

Another distant object publicly known as V774104 was purportedly discovered at around 103 AU on 13 October 2015 by the same team, but public press releases may have confused its distance with Leleākūhonua (V302126, then known as ).  is believed to be V774104.

Study of the population of Solar System objects that are significantly more distant than  will likely require new instruments. The proposed Whipple spacecraft mission is designed to determine the outer limit of the Kuiper belt and directly detect Oort cloud objects out to 10,000 AU. Such objects are too small to detect with current telescopes except during stellar occultations. The proposal involves use of a wide field of view and rapid recording cadence to allow detection of many such events.

Notes

References

External links 
 List Of Centaurs and Scattered-Disk Objects by the Minor Planet Center
 
 
 "Pseudo-MPEC" for 2015 TH367 at Project Pluto

Minor planet object articles (unnumbered)

20151013